Arskan is a computer software company based in Lyon, France founded in 2016. It develops technologies allowing the visualization of massive 3D data.

Description 
Arskan is a young innovative company. It develops technologies for the compression and progressive transfer of massive 3D data. These technologies come from the research work of the CNRS. They allow data visualization of massive 3D data on the web. They are patented.

In 2017, Arskan and SATT Pulsalys signed an operating license for technologies from the Laboratory of Computer Science in Image and Information Systems (LIRIS).

Services 
Arskan markets a solution for viewing and exploiting complex 3D files on the Internet. The size of the files is reduced thanks to compression algorithms, a technology from LIRIS, allowing the exploitation of data from massive 3D files.

Digital twins 
Arskan is part of the CAJuN consortium: Automated creation and management of a collaborative, interactive and real-time digital twin. The other stakeholders in this consortium are Lyon Parc Auto, National Center for Scientific Research (CNRS), National Institute of Applied Sciences of Rennes (INSA) and Pulsalys.

Projects

CAJuN project
For its first customer and beta-tester, Lyon Parc Auto, a parking operator company located in Lyon, ARSKAN generated the digital twin of the Cordeliers car park.

This is the CAJuN project, a consortium created at the instigation of ARSKAN, 40% financed by private funds and by public funds

A beta test is underway with a start-up from Roanne, to integrate data from its predictive maintenance algorithm into the digital twin generated by ARSKAN.

JUMOA project
The JUMOA project was launched in partnership with EDF Hydro to solve problems related to the maintenance of engineering structures and sensitive sites.

Fine arts and heritage
Arskan intervened for the Museum of Fine Arts of Lyon, generating the digital double of the statue of Korè, as well as the gallery of the doors of the Médamoud Temple

References 

Companies based in Lyon
French companies established in 2016